Shields Township is a township in Lake County, Illinois, USA.  As of the 2010 census, its population was 39,062. The Naval Station Great Lakes is located in this township.

Geography

Cities and towns
 Lake Bluff
 Lake Forest (north half)
 North Chicago (Great Lakes Naval Base)

Census-designated place 
 Knollwood CDP (eastern half)

Adjacent townships
 Waukegan Township (north)
 Moraine Township (southeast)
 West Deerfield Township (south)
 Vernon Township (southwest)
 Libertyville Township (west)
 Warren Township (northwest)

Cemeteries
The township contains two cemeteries: Lake Forest and Saint Marys.

Major highways
 U.S. Route 41
 Illinois State Route 43
 Illinois State Route 60
 Illinois State Route 131
 Illinois State Route 137
 Illinois State Route 176

Airports and landing strips
 Lake Forest Hospital Heliport

Railroad lines
 Union Pacific/North Line

Demographics

References
 U.S. Board on Geographic Names (GNIS)
 United States Census Bureau cartographic boundary files

External links
 Shields Township official website
 US-Counties.com
 City-Data.com
 US Census
 Illinois State Archives

Townships in Lake County, Illinois
Townships in Illinois